Adam Liška (born 14 October 1999) is a Slovak professional ice hockey left winger who is currently playing for Severstal Cherepovets of the Kontinental Hockey League (KHL).

Playing career
Liška played as a youth in his native Slovakia, playing within HC Slovan Bratislava junior teams. Selected by the Kitchener Rangers of the Ontario Hockey League, 34th overall, in the 2017 CHL Import Draft, Liška opted to continue his development in North America during the 2017–18 season.

After posting 31 points in 62 games with the Rangers, Liška went undrafted in the 2018 NHL Entry Draft and opted to return to Slovakia with Slovan Bratislava. Liška made his KHL debut in the 2018–19 season, appearing in 52 games as a rookie to contribute with 4 goals and 10 points.

With Bratislava's return to the Slovak Extraliga, Liška decided to continue in the KHL, signing a one-year contract with Russian club, Severstal Cherepovets on 1 July 2019.

International play
On 9 February 2019, Liška made his senior national team debut in Slovakia Cup match against Russia B. He was selected to participate in 2019 IIHF World Championship.

Career statistics

Regular season and playoffs

International

References

External links
 

1999 births
Living people
Kitchener Rangers players
Severstal Cherepovets players
HC Slovan Bratislava players
Slovak ice hockey left wingers
Ice hockey people from Bratislava
Slovak expatriate ice hockey players in Canada
Czech expatriate ice hockey players in Russia